Emerging Kerala is the name given to a biennial investors summit held by the Government of Kerala in Kerala, India. The event is aimed at bringing together business leaders, investors, corporations, thought leaders, policy and opinion makers; the summit is advertised as a platform to understand and explore business chances in the State of Kerala.

Investment options
Twenty-six sectors have been identified and the following Project profiles have been prepared by various Departments, PSUs & other agencies for showcasing in 'Emerging Kerala 2012'

 Tourism
 Healthcare services
 Manufacturing including Engineering & Automotive
 Projects under MSME Sector
 IT / ITES / IT Infrastructure
 Science & Technology
 Trade & Retailing
 Food & Agro Processing and Value-addition
 Ports, Shipbuilding
 Textiles & Garments
 Electronics
 Knowledge / Education sector
 Green Energy
 Bio-Technology, Nano Technology, Pharmaceuticals
 Urban Infrastructure Development
 Infotainment
 Logistics
 Petrochemicals
 Gas based Industries
 Airport Infrastructure, Airplane and Helicopter services
 Centers of Excellence
 Infrastructure development (Road, Rail, Power, Water Supply, Sewage)

Emerging Kerala Global Connect 2012 
The first edition of the Emerging Kerala summit, was held from 12 to 14 September 2012 at the Le Meridien International Convention Centre, Kochi. The event was organised by the Kerala State Industrial Development Corporation (KSIDC), to highlight investment opportunities available in Kerala and advertise to the world its state of readiness to receive investors.
The Hon'ble Prime Minister of India Dr. Manmohan Singh inaugurated the three-day event.

Several programmes were organised in connection with and leading up to Emerging Kerala 2012.

These include:

 Business meets
 Sectoral conclaves;
 Domestic and international road-shows
 Discussion and debates

Besides the inaugural session, the first Global connect had

 Plenary Sessions
 Sectoral presentations;
 Round tables.
 Business to Business (B2B) connects;
 Business to Government (B2G) connects.
 Cultural performances

The event as well as its associated programmes had the support of the Government of Kerala (GoK) and KSIDC, in addition to various trade and industrial bodies. The Confederation of Indian Industry (CII) and the National Association of Software and Services Companies (NASSCOM) were the event partners.

Outcomes of the meet

The meet could bring in 45 specific project proposals with an investment of over Rs.40,000 crore, including Bharat Petroleum Corporation Ltd.'s Kochi Refinery expansion and another joint venture project of Rs.18,000 crore; Volkswagen’s engine assembly unit (Rs.2,000 crore); hospital and pre-cast concrete structure manufacturing unit (Rs.570 crore); and solar energy plant (Rs.500crore).

The Confederation of Indian Industry (CII) had announced the setting up of a Centre of Excellence in Entrepreneurship in the State. During the meeting, 43 business proposals were discussed between different departments of the State and companies from the U.K., the U.S., Japan, and Canada.

The Kerala State Investment Board will be set up by the Government of Kerala to speed up clearance for proposals. Necessary amendments would be made to the single-window clearance Act, including making the application process online.

The Kerala Industrial Infrastructure Development Corporation (KINFRA) would create one lakh sq ft built-up space in 16 months for incubators and complete the first phase of 25,000 sq ft by May 2013, making the world's largest telecom incubator. The State government plans to strengthen the entrepreneurial ecosystem by creating Technology Innovation Zone on about 10 acres in Kochi at an initial investment of Rs.100 crore.

Mega projects
A number of Mega projects are being conceptualized and developed in the State, the most prominent of which are as follows:

Supplementary Gas Infrastructure Project

A Joint Venture Company, Kerala Gail Gas Limited (KGGL) has been formed between KSIDC and M/s. GAIL Gas Limited.  KGGL will take up activities like City Gas Distribution in Kerala, CNG Stations for KSRTC Buses, establishment of Gas Training Institute, laying of Spur Lines from GAIL's main pipeline, setting up of small Gas based small power generating plants etc. The total investment for the project is estimated at Rs.2,000 Crores ($400 million).

Vizhinjam International Deepwater Multipurpose Seaport

The Vizhinjam International Deepwater Multipurpose Seaport is an ambitious project of Government of Kerala, being developed at Vizhinjam in Thiruvananthapuram. The project is proposed to follow Landlord Port Model, where dredging, reclamation and basic infrastructure like construction of break-water and quay will be done by Vizhinjam International Seaport Ltd. (a company fully owned by Govt of Kerala). Port Operation will be on public–private partnership (PPP) model. Terminal superstructure will be built by private operator who will also operate and maintain it for 30 years. The port development along with the external infrastructure work is envisaged to be carried out in phases with the cumulative cost estimated at Rs. 7000 Crores ($1.4 billion). The port is envisaged to provide in total 2000m of quay length in three phases and is designed to cater primarily for containers transshipment, besides providing for other type of cargo such as Multi-Purpose, Break Bulk.

Kochi Metro Rail Project

The Project envisages construction of a world-class Light Mass Rapid Transit System in Kochi to enhance the quality of life for the Greater Kochi metro area by improving regional connections and reducing overcrowding, traffic congestion, transit time, air and noise pollution. The Project, having a total route length of 25 km would be having 21 stations, from Aluva to Pettah. The construction methodology proposed is elevated viaduct carried over pre-stressed concrete ‘U’ shaped girders. A Special Purpose Vehicle (SPV) by the name ‘Kochi Metro Rail Limited’ has been formed for the implementation of the project. The estimated project cost is Rs. 4500 Crores ($900 million).

Monorail Project in Thiruvananthapuram

This is a prestigious single-rail mass transit project of Government of Kerala having a route length of 28.4 km, connecting the towns of Kazhakoottam and Balaramapuram in Thiruvananthapuram district. Monorail is a rail-based transportation system based on a single rail, which acts as its sole support and guideway. The rail will be straightened on a track upon the median that divides the main road. Concerns like land acquisition will be minimum, as only junctions are needed to be widened to incorporate the passage. The running train is to consist of four cars capable of carrying more than 200 persons at a time. The trains would breeze past through the elevated rails at a safe speed of 40Kmph. The total project cost is estimated at Rs. 3408 Crores ($682 million). The detailed Traffic study on the project is being done by National Transportation Planning & Research Centre (NATPAC).

Silver Line (K-Rail) 
The Silver Line is a proposed higher-speed rail line in India that would connect Thiruvananthapuram, the capital city, and Kasaragod of Kerala state. It will have an operating speed of 200 kilometres per hour (120 mph), [Maximum Design Speed: 220 kmph ( 55 mps), (structures designed for 250 kmph ( 69.5 mps))] allowing trains to cover the 532-kilometre (331 mi) distance in less than four hours, compared to the present 10 to 12 hours it takes to traverse this distance. Thiruvananthapuram, Kollam, Chengannur, Kottayam, Ernakulam, Thrissur, Tirur, Kozhikode, Kannur and Kasaragod will be the stations in this corridor. The project is temporarily halted by the state government till the Central government approval.

Other projects
 Petroleum Chemicals & Petrochemical Investment Region (PCPIR)
 Kochi-Palakkad National Investment and Manufacturing Zone (NIMZ)
 Indian Institute of Information Technology, Kottayam (IIIT)
 High Speed Rail Corridor (HSRC) from Thiruvananthapuram to Kasargode
 Sea Plane Services in Kerala
 Electronic Hub at Kochi
 Titanium Sponge Project
 Oceanarium Project at Kochi
 Life Sciences Park at Thiruvananthapuram
 Gas Based Power Project at Cheemeni

See also
 Second Chandy ministry
 Government of Kerala
 KSIDC

References

External links
Emerging Kerala  - Official Website
KSIDC Official Partner

Economy of Kerala
Investment in India
Business conferences in India